This is a list of the Members of Parliament appointed as Escheator of Connaught, a notional 'office of profit under the crown' which was used to resign from the Irish House of Commons.

The office was formerly substantive. It was founded in 1605, when the escheatorship for Ireland was divided among the provinces of Connaught, Leinster, Munster, and Ulster.

Members of the Irish House of Commons
1693: Robert Saunders (Cavan)
1742: St John Bowden (substantive officer)
1799: Hon. Charles Knox (Dungannon)

In 1838, all of the Irish escheatorships were abolished by the Lord Lieutenant of Ireland.

Notes

References

See also 
Escheator
Resignation from the British House of Commons

Lists of British people
Government of the United Kingdom
Lists of Irish people
Lists of Irish parliamentarians